The Conrad N. Hilton Foundation  is an American non-profit charitable foundation, established in 1944 by hotel entrepreneur Conrad Hilton. It remained relatively small until his death on January 3, 1979, when it was named the principal beneficiary of his estate. In 2007, Conrad's son, Barron Hilton announced that he would leave about 97% of his fortune to a charitable remainder unitrust which names the foundation as the remainder beneficiary.

Financial information
The foundation's assets, as of September 2019, were approximately $2.9 billion and had increased to $6.3 billion due to Barron Hilton's passing. Since inception, the foundation has awarded more than $1.7 billion in grants.  Currently more than 50% supports international charitable projects. According to the OECD, the foundation's financing for 2019 development decreased by 11% to US$42.3 million.

Program areas
The foundation's mission is derived from the last will and testament of Conrad Hilton that directs the organization to "relieve the suffering, the distressed, and the destitute." The foundation invests in seven program areas: Catholic sisters, disaster relief and recovery, foster youth, homelessness, hospitality workforce development, safe water, and young children affected by HIV and AIDS. The foundation also supports organizations in four transitioning program areas: avoidable blindness, Catholic education, multiple sclerosis and substance use prevention.

Catholic Sisters
The Hilton Foundation Catholic Sisters program is focused on recognizing catholic sisters as leaders in the human development field by supporting organizations and congregations in the United States and Africa.

Disaster Relief and Recovery
The Disaster Relief and Recovery program supports communities to prepare for disasters and provide long-lasting solution towards long-term recovery.

Foster Youth
This program works with nonprofit organizations in the Los Angeles and New York to provide assistance to transition age youth ages 16–24 as they age out of the foster care system.

Homelessness
The foundation partners with organizations in Los Angeles County to build permanent supportive housing for individuals experiencing chronic homelessness.

Hospitality Workforce Development
This program area works with organizations in New Orleans to provide pathways for young people towards a career in the hospitality industry.

Safe Water
Working with international nonprofits and government agencies in Burkina Faso, Ethiopia, Ghana, Mali, Niger and Uganda to build water systems.

Young Children Affected by HIV and AIDS
The program focuses on early childhood development globally and partners with international and local NGOs working in HIV prevalent communities in Kenya, Malawi, Mozambique, Tanzania and Zambia.

Transitioning Programs
The Hilton Foundation is transitioning out of the following program areas:
Avoidable Blindness
Catholic Education
Multiple Sclerosis
Substance Use Prevention

Conrad N. Hilton Humanitarian Prize
The Conrad N. Hilton Humanitarian Prize is awarded annually by the foundation. It was inaugurated in 1996 and is the largest humanitarian award in the world. Its annual award of USD 1.5 million was increased in 2015 to 2 million to commemorate its 20th Hilton Humanitarian Prize laureate, Landesa. It is currently larger than any one of the six Nobel Prizes.

Conrad N. Hilton Humanitarian Prize Laureates

1996 – Operation Smile
1997 – International Rescue Committee
1998 – Médecins Sans Frontières
1999 – African Medical and Research Foundation
2000 – Casa Alianza
2001 – St Christopher's Hospice
2002 – SOS Children's Villages
2003 – International Rehabilitation Council for Torture Victims
2004 – Heifer International
2005 – Partners in Health
2006 – Women for Women International
2007 – Tostan Organization
2008 – BRAC
2009 – Program for Appropriate Technology in Health
2010 – Aravind Eye Care System
2011 – Handicap International
2012 – HelpAge International
2013 – ECPAT
2014 – Fountain House & Clubhouse International.
2015 – Landesa
2016 – The Task Force for Global Health
2017 – International Centre for Diarrhoeal Disease Research, Bangladesh
2018 – Shining Hope for Communities
2019 – METAdrasi

Conrad N. Hilton Humanitarian Prize Jury
Gro Harlem Brundtland, former director general, World Health Organization; former prime minister of Norway
Leymah Gbowee, founder and president of the Gbowee Peace Foundation Africa
Hawley Hilton McAuliffe, board of directors, Conrad N. Hilton Foundation
Mark Rosenberg, MD, MPP, board of directors, Conrad N. Hilton Foundation
Zainab Salbi, founder, Women for Women International; TV host; author
Ann M. Veneman, former executive director, United Nations Children's Fund (UNICEF; former United States Secretary of Agriculture

Leadership
Conrad Hilton's granddaughter, Hawley Hilton McAULIFFE, became chair of the board January 2021, superseding Steven M. Hilton, who was the chairman of the organization for most of its existence. He started working at the foundation in 1983 and served as its CEO from 2005 to 2015. Hilton retired as president and CEO, and was succeeded by Peter Laugharn. In his retirement announcement, Hilton said, “When I joined the Hilton Foundation in 1983, I couldn’t imagine the path that lay ahead. At that time, a handful of staff guided about $6 million in grants annually. Fast forward to today, and we have grown to a staff of over 50 and have awarded over a billion dollars in grants to improve the lives of disadvantaged and vulnerable people around the world.” Peter Laugharn began his tenure as president and CEO on January 1, 2016.

Board of Directors
As of May 22, 2021

Steven M. Hilton (chairman emeritus)
Donald H. Hubbs (director emeritus)
Kofi Appenteng, 2019–
James R. Galbraith, 1989–
Conrad N. Hilton III, 2001–
Linda Hilton (vice chair)2014–
Michael O. Hilton, 2017–
Hawley Hilton McAuliffe (chair) 2006–
Justin McAuliffe, 2019–
Sister Joyce Meyer, PBVM, 2009–
John L. Notter. 2005–
Mark Rosenberg, MD, MPP, 2016–

References

External links
Conrad N. Hilton Foundation official website
List of wealthiest charitable foundations
Hilton family

Humanitarian and service awards
Foundations based in the United States
Organizations established in 1944
Conrad Hilton family